The Mo-Ark Baptist Academy is a historic religious school building in Blue Eye, Arkansas.  It is located just south of the western end of Park Street, not far from the state line with Blue Eye, Missouri.  It is a large T-shaped two-story brick building with a hip roof, built in 1918 to house what was initially called the Carroll County Institute.  At first funded by the Arkansas Baptist Convention and the Southern Baptist Convention, it eventually also received funding from Missouri Baptists, and was renamed (first to Mo-Ark Baptist Academy and then Armo Academy).  The school was later expanded to include both boys and girls dormitories; the latter still stands nearby.  The school closed its doors in 1931; the building was used by the Green Forest School District as an elementary school into the 1950s, and has since seen intermittent use as a community center.

The building was listed on the National Register of Historic Places in 1996.

See also
National Register of Historic Places listings in Carroll County, Arkansas

References

Churches on the National Register of Historic Places in Arkansas
Defunct Christian schools in the United States
School buildings on the National Register of Historic Places in Arkansas
School buildings completed in 1918
Buildings and structures in Carroll County, Arkansas
National Register of Historic Places in Carroll County, Arkansas
Educational institutions established in 1918
Educational institutions disestablished in 1931
1918 establishments in Arkansas
1931 disestablishments in Arkansas